Pachycheles rudis, the thickclaw porcelain crab, is a species of porcelain crab in the family Porcellanidae. It is found in the East Pacific.

References

Further reading

 

Anomura
Crustaceans of the eastern Pacific Ocean
Crustaceans described in 1859
Taxa named by William Stimpson
Articles created by Qbugbot